A statue of John Glover by Martin Milmore is installed along Boston's Commonwealth Avenue Mall, in the U.S. state of Massachusetts.

Description
The bronze sculpture of the Continental Army brigadier general measures approximately 8 ft. x 3 ft. 6 in. x 3 ft. 6 in., and rests on a granite base that measures approximately 6 ft. 6 in. x 5 ft. 6 in. x 5 ft. 6 in.

History
It was completed in 1875. The work was surveyed as part of the Smithsonian Institution's "Save Outdoor Sculpture!" program in 1993.

Reception 
The sculpture was met with a lukewarm reception in the nineteenth century. William H. Downes complained that it was "rather showy and theatrical, and comes near to being bombastic in its effect."

References

External links

 

1875 sculptures
Bronze sculptures in Massachusetts
Granite sculptures in Massachusetts
Monuments and memorials in Boston
Outdoor sculptures in Boston
Sculptures of men in Massachusetts
Statues in Boston